Dirichlet averages are averages of functions under the Dirichlet distribution. An important one are dirichlet averages that have a certain argument structure, namely

 

They also play an important role for the solution of elliptic integrals (see Carlson symmetric form) and are connected to statistical applications in various ways, for example in Bayesian analysis.

Notable Dirichlet averages 
Some Dirichlet averages are so fundamental that they are named. A few are listed below.

R-function

 

Exact solutions:

For  it is possible to write an exact solution in the form of an iterative sum

 

S-function

References 

Calculus